Copobathra is a genus of moths in the family Lyonetiidae.

Species
Copobathra menodora Meyrick, 1911

External links
Butterflies and Moths of the World Generic Names and their Type-species

Lyonetiidae
Moth genera